Fiz or FIZ may refer to:

Fiz Brown, a character on Coronation Street
FIZ Karlsruhe, a German research institute
BMW FIZ, a German research lab
Fitzroy Crossing Airport, IATA airport code "FIZ", in Western Australia
Martín Fiz (born 1963), Spanish athlete
Free Industrial Zone, a type of free-trade zone

See also

 
 
 
 Fizz (disambiguation)